Resurrection is the second studio album by American rapper Common Sense. It was released on October 4, 1994, by Relativity Records. It was mainly produced by No I.D., who also produced most of Common's 1992 debut Can I Borrow A Dollar? It is the last album to feature the rapper's full stage name, as after this album the "Sense" portion of the name was dropped, making the rapper simply known to this day as "Common".

The album received critical acclaim but not a significant amount of mainstream attention. Originally, it was rated 3.5 mics in The Source; however, in 1998, it was selected as one of The Source's 100 Best Hip Hop Albums.

Songs
The album is divided into two sections: the "East Side of Stony" (tracks 1–7) and "West Side of Stony" (tracks 8-15). Stony Island Avenue is a street that runs through the South Side of Chicago, where Common was raised. The closing track, "Pop's Rap" was the first of a series of tracks featuring spoken word and poetry by Common's father Lonnie "Pops" Lynn Sr., whom Common has used to close several of his albums since. Interlaced throughout the album are short interludes that form a loose narrative concerning day-to-day life on the South Side.

Songs such as "Thisisme", are full of self-assessing rhymes that reflect the emcee's personal growth since 1992's Can I Borrow A Dollar?  Likewise the crasser moments found on that LP, such as the misogynistic "Heidi Hoe" are greatly toned down for Resurrection, and replaced by thought-provoking narratives such as "Chapter 13 (Rich Man Vs. Poor Man)", and "I Used to Love H.E.R." - a song that re-imagines Hip hop as a formerly unadulterated woman, led astray after being enticed by materialistic elements of life. The use of a conflicted woman as an allegory for Hip hop allowed Common to covertly express his disdain at the genre's turn toward gangsta-inspired content and what he saw as the resulting reorientation of hip hop artists.

This song, which brought Common to the attention of fans and music critics alike, would also become the cause of a rift between the rapper and West Coast emcee Ice Cube, who took exception to the insinuation that the West Coast pioneered gangsta style was detrimental to hip hop—even going as far as to claim that hip hop altogether "started in the West". Together with his Westside Connection compatriots, Cube hurled insults Common's way on the song "Westside Slaughterhouse" and throughout the group's album Bow Down, to which the rapper replied with the equally venomous "The Bitch in Yoo." In the aftermath of the murders of both Tupac Shakur and the Notorious B.I.G., the rivalry would be settled out of public view at a peacemaking function held by Louis Farrakhan at his home.

The album is broken down track-by-track by Common in Brian Coleman's book Check the Technique.

Lyricism
The lyricism of Resurrection is acclaimed. Using a combination of irony and double entendre, the rapper related on "Book of Life":

In The Source, Chairman Mao wrote that "Common Sense presents a thinking man's perspective on rhyming that's admirably down to earth and free of gimmicks". Common's style of delivery, speedy and somewhat erratic on Can I Borrow, is here smoother and more evenly paced. As before he occasionally ventures into a faux-singing mode, albeit less frequently (for example, he quotes the refrain of "Get Up, Stand Up" in "Book of Life"). Many of the songs hooks are provided by scratches and samples.

Production
For Resurrection, producer No I.D. polished up on the production techniques from
Can I Borrow, providing for Common, a canvas full of lush jazz samples, deep, throbbing basslines, dusty, thumping drums, and crackling snares. With the majority of tracks handled by one producer (the exceptions being "Chapter 13" and "Sum Shit I Wrote" by Ynot), the album maintains a cohesive feel and fluid sequencing.

The sounds range from the upbeat ("Communism") to the downbeat (""Nuthin' To Do""), and from the smooth and sleek ("I Used to Love H.E.R."), to the rugged ("Sum Shit I Wrote").  Similar to other Hip hop productions of the time, the sources for many of the samples are from less obvious choices such as The New Apocalypse, and their cover of "Get Out Of My Life, Woman", which is used for the song "Watermelon".

Reception and aftermath 

Resurrection is frequently held to be a classic album by hip hop-music critics. This album signified both the arrival of a level of maturity in Common's work, and yet the end of his first phase, which was characterized by a more straightforward and underground-based sound. Subsequent albums by the emcee would see him delving into experimentation and themes such as love, which perhaps marked his second phase.

In the Rolling Stone review, Touré wrote of the album: "Resurrection belongs among the best recent hardcore albums: Illmatic by Nas, Enter the Wu-Tang (36 Chambers) by Wu-Tang Clan, and Ready to Die by the Notorious B.I.G." Despite critical acclaim, the album sold poorly, peaking at #179 on the Billboard 200 with 2,000 copies sold before dropping out of the charts the following week.

Influence and legacy 
Chicago rapper, producer, protégé of No I.D., and frequent collaborator of Common, Kanye West, has echoed lines from Resurrection on multiple records. 

On "Jesus Walks", the fourth single from his debut album, The College Dropout, West mimics with the opening lines of "I Used to Love H.E.R.", stating:

Yeah, yeah, now check the method

On "Homecoming", the twelfth track from his third LP, Graduation, West drops a reference to "In My Own World (Check the Method)" in the song's first verse, stating:

I met this girl when I was three years old

And what I loved most, she had so much soul

Track listing
All tracks produced by No I.D., except tracks 12 and 14 produced by Ynot.

Chart positions

Album chart positions

Singles chart positions

Name
The album was originally released under Common's original stage name, "Common Sense." However, the "Sense" has since been dropped from the album's listings because of a legal case between Common and a California-based ska band named Common Sense. 
The song "Thisisme" is used as the name for Common's greatest hits compilation, Thisisme Then: The Best of Common.

References

1994 albums
Common (rapper) albums
Relativity Records albums
Albums produced by No I.D.